Gülşah Akkaya (born October 6, 1977) is a Turkish professional woman basketball player in forward position. The 1.81 m (5' 11½") tall national player is a top scorer.

Akkaya started playing basketball at the age of 13. She debuted in Deniz Nakliyat and then transferred to Fenerbahçe İstanbul where she played in 1995-96 season. In 1997, she moved to the USA and played in the American NCAA with the Lynn University team in two seasons until 1999. She still ranks 4th with an average of 23.8 points in the all-time list of single season points per season for her time being at Boca Raton, Florida.

After Akkaya returned home and was with Fenerbahçe İstanbul in the season 1999-00, she transferred to the Greek club Panserraikos in Thessaloniki for 2002-03 season and became top scorer with 204 points. In 2003, Akkaya played in YES Ramat HaSharon club in Ramat HaSharon, Israel. She helped her team win the championship by scoring a basket at the latest second. Returned to Turkey in 2003, Akkaya played for Erdemirspor in Zonguldak.

Akkaya participated at the 2005 Mediterranean Games in Almería, Spain with the Turkish national team, which won a gold medal.

She was top scorer in Turkish Women's Basketball League with her average of 22.0 points in 25 games in the 2004-05 season.

She also played for Beşiktaş for the 2005-06 season. That year she played in the league finals with Beşiktaş. For 2006-2007 season she returned to Mersin B.B. sports club and played with an average of 17.0 points per game and help Mersin to play in playoffs. She also played for Galatasaray in the 2007-08 season.

She was member of Spanish club El Cadi La Seu D'Urgell sports club for the 2008-09 season. She played for Samsun B.K. between 2009 and 2011.

Akkaya played in the national team that won the silber medal at the EuroBasket Women 2011 championship held in Poland.

During the 2011-12 season, Gülşah played for TED Ankara Kolejliler. By the start of the season 2012-13, she was transferred to Canik, after playing half of the season with Canik, Gülşah returned to Beşiktaş in January 2013, and played with 12,4 points and 4,3 rebounds for the rest of the season.

Honors

Individual
 Turkish Women's Basketball League 2004-05 Top Scorer

National team
 2005 Mediterranean Games 
 EuroBasket Women 2011

See also
 Turkish women in sports

References 

1977 births
Living people
Turkish women's basketball players
Turkish expatriate basketball people
Turkish expatriate basketball people in Greece
Turkish expatriate basketball people in Spain
Turkish expatriate basketball people in Israel
Turkish expatriate basketball people in the United States
Fenerbahçe women's basketball players
Beşiktaş women's basketball players
Galatasaray S.K. (women's basketball) players
Mersin Büyükşehir Belediyesi women's basketball players
Lynn Fighting Knights women's basketball players
People from Bornova
Sportspeople from İzmir
Forwards (basketball)